Derwyn Trevor Owen (29 July 1876— 9 April 1947) was the sixth  Primate of the Anglican Church of Canada and the fifth Bishop of Niagara then Toronto.

Early life and career
Educated at Trinity College, Toronto, he was ordained in 1901. He held curacies at St John's Church, Toronto and then St James’ Cathedral in the same city. He was rector of Holy Trinity Church, Toronto from 1908 to 1914 and then the Dean of Niagara until his ordination to the episcopate.

Episcopate
Owen was consecrated as Bishop on 24 June 1925 and enthroned as Bishop of Niagara. He was translated in 1932 to be the Bishop of Toronto. In 1934 he was elected Primate of All Canada, and thereafter styled Archbishop of Toronto and Primate of All Canada (although he was not the Metropolitan of the Province of Ontario, of which Toronto diocese is a part).

Private life
Owen was a Freemason, and a member of Ionic Lodge No 25, Toronto. He married Nora Grier Jellett. His son, Derwyn R.G. Owen, became Provost of Trinity College, Toronto, Owen Senior's old college. An oral history interview of Derwyn R.G. Owen, which includes an account of his family history, can be found at the University of Toronto Archives and Records Management Services.

References 

1876 births
1947 deaths
20th-century Anglican archbishops
20th-century Anglican Church of Canada bishops
Anglican bishops of Toronto
Anglican bishops of Niagara
Canadian Freemasons
Deans of Niagara
Primates of the Anglican Church of Canada
Trinity College (Canada) alumni